Megan Jones (born 23 October 1996) is a Welsh and English rugby union player. She debuted for England against New Zealand in 2015. She plays for Wasps Ladies at club level.

Her partner is Team GB international teammate Celia Quansah.

International career 
Jones travelled to the 2016 Olympic Games in Rio de Janeiro as a non-playing reserve for Team GB sevens.

Despite being a Welsh-speaker and growing up Wales, Jones made her XVs debut for England in July 2015, playing against New Zealand in the Rugby Super Series that year. She then played off the bench in England's 39-6 win over Canada in the Old Mutual Wealth Series.

She was named in the English squad for the 2017 Women's Rugby World Cup in Ireland, where she scored the side's opening try (against Spain). She also played in the semi-final versus France and started in the final.

Also in 2017, Jones played in the first two matches of the 2017 International Women's Rugby Series playing at outside centre and inside centre.

In late 2017, Jones joined the England Sevens programme full time. The England Sevens men and women's teams were made redundant in August 2020.

In 2021, she returned to rugby XVs as an invitational player for England in the 2021 Women's Six Nations Championship.

Club career 
Jones played for Bristol Bears Women until she signed for Wasps Ladies in 2020, where she continues to play as a fly-half.

Early life and education 
Born in Cardiff, Jones was educated at Ysgol Gyfun Gymraeg Glantaf and began her rugby career at Glamorgan Wanderers, aged six.

She studied Sports Science and Management at Hartpury College and went on to receive a BSc Honours in Sport Science and management from Loughborough.

During the 2020 Covid-19 lockdowns, Jones offered free online fitness sessions for kids. She has also been coaching Barnes Women after being made redundant by the Rugby Football Union.

Personal life 
Jones is openly lesbian, and is in a same-sex relationship with her England 7s team mate Celia Quansah. The couple are representing Great Britain together at the 2020 Tokyo Olympics.

Notes

References

External links 
 RFU Player Profile

1996 births
Living people
Alumni of Hartpury College
Commonwealth Games bronze medallists for England
Commonwealth Games medallists in rugby sevens
England women's international rugby union players
English female rugby union players
Lesbian sportswomen
LGBT rugby union players
English LGBT sportspeople
Olympic rugby sevens players of Great Britain
Rugby sevens players at the 2018 Commonwealth Games
Rugby sevens players at the 2020 Summer Olympics
Rugby union players from Cardiff
England international women's rugby sevens players
Medallists at the 2018 Commonwealth Games